The United States ambassador to Dominica is the official representative of the government of the United States to the government of Dominica. The title of the ambassador is United States Ambassador to Barbados and the Eastern Caribbean and is concurrently the ambassador to Antigua and Barbuda, Barbados, Grenada, St. Kitts and Nevis, St. Lucia, and St. Vincent and the Grenadines.

No mission has ever been established at Roseau. All diplomatic functions are handled out of the U.S. Embassy at Bridgetown, Barbados.

List of U.S. ambassadors to Dominica
The following is a list of U.S. ambassadors, or other chiefs of mission, to Dominica. The title given by the United States State Department to this position is currently Ambassador Extraordinary and Plenipotentiary.

See also
Dominica – United States relations
Foreign relations of Dominica
Ambassadors of the United States

References

 
United States Department of State: Background notes on Dominica

External links
 United States Department of State: Chiefs of Mission for Dominica
 United States Department of State: Dominica
 United States Embassy in Bridgetown

 01
United States
Dominica
Dominica